Little Loyalsock Creek is the major tributary of Loyalsock Creek in Lycoming and Sullivan counties, Pennsylvania, United States. Via Loyalsock Creek and the West Branch Susquehanna River, it is part of the Susquehanna River drainage basin, and waters from it flow ultimately into the Chesapeake Bay.

Course
Little Loyalsock Creek has its source near the borough of Dushore in Sullivan County, then flows west-southwest to its confluence with Loyalsock Creek in the borough of Forksville.

See also
List of rivers of Pennsylvania

References

External links
Pennsylvania Department of Environmental Protection 2001 Pennsylvania Gazetteer of Streams
Lycoming County Watersheds Map
History of Lycoming County Pennsylvania edited by John F. Meginness, ©1892 (copyright expired)
Official Lycoming County Map showing all townships, villages, boroughs, cities, county roads, rivers, creeks, and some streams

Tributaries of Loyalsock Creek
Rivers of Pennsylvania
Rivers of Lycoming County, Pennsylvania
Rivers of Sullivan County, Pennsylvania